Ben Lhassine Kone (born 14 March 2000) is an Ivorian professional footballer who plays as a forward for Italian  club Frosinone on loan from Torino.

Club career

Torino
He started playing for Torino's under-19 team in the 2017–18 season.

He also received occasional call-ups to the senior squad during the 2017–18 Serie A and 2018–19 Serie A seasons, but did not make any appearances.

Loan to Cosenza
On 3 August 2019 he joined Serie B club Cosenza on a season-long loan. He made his Serie B debut for Cosenza on 31 August 2019 in a game against Salernitana. He substituted Riccardo Idda in the 79th minute. He missed most of the 2019–20 season due to cruciate ligament rupture.

On 15 September 2020, the loan was renewed for the 2020–21 season.

Return to Torino
After returning to Torino for the 2021–22 season, Kone made his debut for the club on 17 October 2021, coming on as a substitute for the injured Rolando Mandragora in a 1–0 away loss to Napoli. He was replaced again in injury time for Magnus Warming.

Loan to Crotone
On 26 January 2022, he joined Crotone on loan.

Loan to Frosinone
On 1 August 2022, Kone moved to Frosinone on loan.

References

External links
 

2000 births
Living people
Ivorian footballers
Association football forwards
Torino F.C. players
Cosenza Calcio players
F.C. Crotone players
Frosinone Calcio players
Serie B players
Serie A players
Ivorian expatriate footballers
Expatriate footballers in Italy
Ivorian expatriate sportspeople in Italy